Egersundsposten was a Norwegian newspaper, published in Egersund in Rogaland county.

Egersundsposten was started in 1865. It went defunct in 1940.

References

1865 establishments in Norway
1940 disestablishments in Norway
Defunct newspapers published in Norway
Egersund
Norwegian-language newspapers
Newspapers established in 1865
Publications disestablished in 1940
Mass media in Rogaland